The 2014 LSU Tigers football team represented Louisiana State University in the 2014 NCAA Division I FBS football season. They were led by tenth-year head coach Les Miles and played their home games at Tiger Stadium. They were a member of the Western Division of the Southeastern Conference (SEC).

Previous season and offseason
LSU finished the 2013 regular season with an overall record of 10–3 and SEC record of 5–3.  All three losses occurred on the road - narrow losses against Georgia and Ole Miss, as well as a loss against #1 ranked Alabama.  The Tigers were undefeated in Tiger Stadium, including a victory over the national runners-up, the Auburn Tigers.  With its victory against Texas A&M, LSU became the only team to defeat Johnny Manziel twice in his college career.  Despite losing starting quarterback Zach Mettenberger to a knee injury in the closing minutes of the regular season finale against Arkansas, the season ended with a win against Iowa in the Outback Bowl.

Shortly after the bowl game, LSU issued a statement that offensive line coach Greg Studrawa would be leaving the team. After a brief search, coach Les Miles announced the hiring of Jeff Grimes to replace Studrawa.  Grimes served as the offensive line coach for Virginia Tech in 2013.  Prior to Virginia Tech, Grimes spent four years at the same position at Auburn, where he helped that team win the national championship in 2010.  LSU was also in need of a new special teams coordinator after Thomas McGaughey left to take the same position with the New York Jets.  The Tigers hired Bradley Dale Peveto, who previously spent four seasons as an assistant at LSU from 2005 to 2008, as his replacement.

For the second year in a row, LSU had more underclassmen declare for the NFL Draft than any other team in the country.  Key losses included Mettenberger, third-team All American Odell Beckham Jr., and second-team All-SEC players Jarvis Landry, Jeremy Hill, Anthony Johnson, and Lamin Barrow.

The Tigers' 2014 recruiting class was considered one of the top in the nation, bolstered by several top prospects from the state of Louisiana, including New Orleans running back Leonard Fournette, River Ridge wide receiver Malachi Dupre, and Lake Charles wide receiver Trey Quinn.  The class was considered the consensus #2 class by all the major recruiting outlets.

Key departures

Class of 2014 signees

Coaching staff

Depth chart
The official opening day depth chart was released on August 22, 2014.ScheduleSchedule Source:Rankings

Players DraftedReference:'''

References

LSU
LSU Tigers football seasons
LSU Tigers football